East Chillisquaque Township is a township in Northumberland County, Pennsylvania, United States. The population at the 2010 Census was 668, an increase over the figure of 664 tabulated in 2000.

History

The Rishel Covered Bridge and Gottlieb Brown Covered Bridge are listed on the National Register of Historic Places.

Geography

Demographics

As of the census of 2000, there were 664 people, 262 households, and 195 families residing in the township. The population density was 82.2 people per square mile (31.7/km2). There were 276 housing units at an average density of 34.1/sq mi (13.2/km2). The racial makeup of the township was 99.10% White, 0.60% African American, 0.30% from other races. Hispanic or Latino of any race were 0.90% of the population.

There were 262 households, out of which 32.4% had children under the age of 18 living with them, 67.2% were married couples living together, 4.2% had a female householder with no husband present, and 25.2% were non-families. 21.8% of all households were made up of individuals, and 10.3% had someone living alone who was 65 years of age or older. The average household size was 2.53 and the average family size was 2.95.

In the township the population was spread out, with 25.2% under the age of 18, 5.7% from 18 to 24, 27.7% from 25 to 44, 25.5% from 45 to 64, and 16.0% who were 65 years of age or older. The median age was 40 years. For every 100 females, there were 103.7 males. For every 100 females age 18 and over, there were 95.7 males.

The median income for a household in the township was $40,882, and the median income for a family was $43,958. Males had a median income of $34,167 versus $22,000 for females. The per capita income for the township was $18,431. About 4.3% of families and 5.0% of the population were below the poverty line, including 4.3% of those under age 18 and 3.6% of those age 65 or over.

Notes and references

Populated places established in 1769
Townships in Northumberland County, Pennsylvania
Townships in Pennsylvania